Erik Adrián Pedroza Guerrero (born April 11, 1994, in Nuevo León) is a Mexican professional footballer who currently plays for Correcaminos UAT.

References

1994 births
Living people
Association football defenders
Correcaminos UAT footballers
Cimarrones de Sonora players
Ascenso MX players
Liga Premier de México players
Tercera División de México players
Footballers from Nuevo León
Sportspeople from Monterrey
Mexican footballers